Metrolina is the metropolitan area within and surrounding the city of  Charlotte, North Carolina.

Metrolina may also refer to:

 Metrolina Native American Association, a Native American community association in Mecklenburg County, North Carolina
 Metrolina Regional Scholars' Academy, a charter school in Charlotte, North Carolina
 Metrolina Speedway, a defunct auto racing track located in northeast Charlotte, North Carolina
 Metrolina Theatre Association, a non-profit organization based in Charlotte, North Carolina

See also

 
 Metroliner (disambiguation)
 Metro line (disambiguation)